Megaluropidae is a family of amphipods belonging to the order Amphipoda.

Genera:
 Aurohornellia Barnard & Karaman, 1982
 Gibberosus Thomas & Barnard, 1986
 Magnovis Alves, Lowry & Johnsson, 2020
 Megaloura Hoek, 1889
 Megaluropus Hoek, 1889
 Resupinus Thomas & Barnard, 1986

References

Amphipoda
Crustacean families